The Honda CB450 is a standard motorcycle made by Honda from 1965 to 1974 with a  180° DOHC straight-twin engine. Producing 45 bhp (some 100 bhp/ litre), it was Honda's first "big" motorcycle, though it did not succeed in its goal of competing directly against the larger Triumphs, Nortons, and Harley-Davidsons in the North American market at the time. As a result, Honda tried again, leading to the development of the four cylinder Honda CB750 that marked a turning point for Honda and beginning of the "superbike" era of motorcycles.

Design
The CB450 had a distinctive chrome-sided fuel tank, and shared Honda's 'family' styling found elsewhere on the S90 and CD175. Early models were known as the 'Black Bomber', or 'Dragon', but in Canada the K1 model was marketed as the 'Hellcat'.

The four-speed K0 model was updated in the K1 model produced from 1968 with a redesigned fuel tank, rubber-gaitered front forks instead of sliding metal shrouds, a five-speed gearbox and twin speedometer and rev-counter instruments mounted above the headlamp.

Later developments progressed through a series of 'K' models with various improvements and styling changes including a single front disc brake, continuing to K7 versions in some markets, until the introduction of the CB500T in 1975.

Release
The Mk.I 'Black Bomber' was first shown in UK during the Diamond Jubilee Brighton Speed Trials of September 1965, traditionally held along the seafront. Afterwards, the CB450 was exhibited at a motorcycle show at the Brighton Metropole Hotel exhibition centre.

In December 1965, the UK magazine Motor Cycle reported that UK sales were planned from February 1966, its price of £360 being the equivalent cost to a conventional British 650cc pushrod parallel-twin.

In a further publicity event, Honda (UK) entered Mike Hailwood as one of the riders in the Motor Cycle 500 mile production race at Brands Hatch during July 1966. However, Hailwood was able to complete only some demonstration laps on the CB450 before racing began, as it was barred from competing in the 500cc category, because the FIM had deemed that it "could not be classified as a production machine as it had two overhead camshafts"!

Although the CB450's sales never matched Honda's expectations, the bike had excellent engineering for the time, including reliable electrical components, an electric starter, and a horizontally split crankcase, all features distinct from current British twins. A radical feature was the valve springing: instead of the conventional coil springs, it used 'torsion bars' – rods of steel that twisted to provide the spring effect.

Follow on development of Honda CB750 
When it became clear that the CB450 did not have the size and power to compete in the US market directly against Triumph, Norton, and Harley-Davidson's large-displacement models, Honda shifted its focus, starting development in early 1967 of what would eventually become the milestone Honda CB750. Company President Soichiro Honda ended the successful Grand Prix racing program, announcing Honda's withdrawal from racing in 1968 because it had become a distraction from production motorcycle development.

American Honda's national service manager Bob Hansen later discussed his role in the decision to switch from initial plans for an all new, but still twin-cylinder, CB450, to the inline four of the CB750. Hansen had displayed in his office a September 16, 1968 letter from Honda R&D crediting him with changing Mr. Honda's plans for a twin to a four cylinder. Within North American Honda, Hansen's recollection of these events became well known, that in 1967 he visited Japan and toured a Honda R&D facility, where he became intrigued because he was not allowed to enter the facility's engine testing area for "Project 300", as the successor of the CB450 was known. Acting on this guess, Hansen mentioned to Soichiro Honda he hoped the new engine would not be a twin, since twins were becoming dated, and would be uncompetitive against the likes of Triumph, who were about to release a triple. The letter in Hansen's office verified that Honda had been testing a twin and changed to a four at the American's suggestion, without ever addressing Hansen's guess that the twin came from the N600 kei car. Nonetheless, the rumor that the N600 was somehow related to the CB750 or even the CB450 traces its origins to Hansen's anecdote.

References

Cb450
Standard motorcycles
Motorcycles powered by straight-twin engines
Motorcycles introduced in 1965